This list contains the top 20 posts with the most likes on the photo and video-sharing social networking service Instagram.

The most-liked post  is a carousel of the Argentine footballer Lionel Messi and his teammates celebrating the 2022 FIFA World Cup win at Lusail Stadium in Lusail, Qatar, which has been liked by over 75 million different accounts. Uploaded on December 18, 2022, the post shows Messi lifting his first World Cup Trophy after Argentina's win over France in the final. It is also the most liked post of all time across all social media platforms.

Current record 

On December 18, 2022, footballer Lionel Messi posted a carousel with photos of him lifting the FIFA World Cup Trophy and celebrating with his teammates after winning the 2022 FIFA World Cup with Argentina, which reached 10 million likes within the first 39 minutes of its sharing. The following day, the post became the most-liked Instagram post in the first 24 hours of its sharing, with 50 million likes, and it also became the most-liked ever for a sportsperson, breaking the record of Cristiano Ronaldo, whose photo from November 19, 2022, of him and Messi playing chess reached over 42 million likes. On December 20, 2022, the post reached over 56 million likes, surpassing the previous record held by @world_record_egg. Messi also has a record seven (shared with Cristiano Ronaldo) out of the top 20 most-liked posts, with posts mainly released around the 2022 FIFA World Cup.

Within 48 hours of Messi posting, the Instagram post had surpassed 64 million likes, and in doing so, it became the most-liked social media post ever across all social media platforms, by overtaking the most-liked post on YouTube, the music video for the song "Despacito", which had reached 50.2 million likes, and the most-liked post on TikTok, a video uploaded by Bella Poarch featuring her lip-syncing to the song "Sophie Aspin Send", which had reached 60.3 million likes. This also meant that it became the first ever post on Instagram to reach 60 and 70 million likes, achieving that in just 3 days since it was posted.

Previous record 
On January 4, 2019, the account @world_record_egg posted a photo of an egg with the specific purpose of surpassing the then most-liked Instagram post, a picture of Kylie Jenner's daughter with 18.6 million likes. The photo of the egg was originally taken by Serghei Platanov, who then posted it to Shutterstock on June 23, 2015, with the title "eggs isolated on white background." The creator of the @world_record_egg account was Chris Godfrey, an advertising creative, and his friends CJ Brown and Alissa Khan-Whelan.

On January 14, 2019, the egg post became the most-liked post on Instagram, to which the egg's account owner wrote "This is madness. What a time to be alive." Jenner responded with a video on Instagram of her cracking an egg open with the caption: "Take that little egg." Platanov was surprised by his photo's popularity, writing, "Egg is just an egg."

Top 20 posts
Two accounts have more than one post in the top 20 most-liked posts list: Lionel Messi and Cristiano Ronaldo have seven each.

Historical most-liked posts
The following table lists the last ten posts that were once the most-liked post on Instagram, with the number of likes as they were when the top spot was reached.

See also

 List of most-followed Instagram accounts
 List of most-liked tweets
 List of most-retweeted tweets
 List of most-liked YouTube videos
 List of most-liked TikTok videos
 List of most-followed Facebook pages

References

Lists of Internet-related superlatives
Instagram-related lists
Instagram posts